Acanthopidae is a family of mantises consisting of 16 genera in the order Mantodea. The group was first formally split off as a separate family by the German entomologist Reinhard Ehrmann in 2002. In 2016, five genera (Acontista, Callibia, Paratithrone, Raptrix, and Tithrone) were moved from Acanthopidae to the newly created family Acontistidae, but this has not been accepted in most recent classifications.

Genera
The following genera are recognised in the family Acanthopidae:
 Acanthops Serville, 1831
 Acontista Saussure, 1872
 Astollia Kirby, 1904
 Callibia  Stal, 1877
 Decimiana Uvarov, 1940
 Lagrecacanthops Roy, 2004
 Metacanthops Agudelo, Maldaner & Rafael, 2019
 Metilia Stal, 1877
 Miracanthops Roy, 2004
 Ovalimantis  Roy, 2015
 Paratithrone Lombardo, 1996
 Plesiacanthops Chopard, 1913
 Pseudacanthops Saussure, 1870
 Raptrix Terra, 1995
 Stenophylla  Westwood, 1845
 Tithrone Stal, 1877

See also
List of mantis genera and species

References

 
Mantodea families